William F. West High School, commonly referred to as W. F. West, is a public high school in Chehalis, Washington, United States. It is the only high school in the Chehalis School District. It was named for local businessman William F. West, who donated money and land to the school district. The principal is Bob Walters. The school prides itself in the amount of scholarships given out yearly. Many students travel out of district to attend. The school added a brand new science wing in 2018.

Extracurricular activities
The school's athletic teams compete as the Bearcats as a member of the Washington Interscholastic Activities Association in the 2A Evergreen Conference.

The Bearcats were fastpitch WIAA 2A State Champions in 2015, as well as baseball State Champions in 2010 and 2013.

The school sponsors the following sports and extracurricular activities:
Fall: theatre, cheerleading, football, girls' soccer, cross country, boys' tennis, boys' golf, girls' swimming, volleyball, forensics, rifle team, pep band, and Bowling Club 
Winter: cheerleading, pep band, wrestling, girls' basketball, boys' basketball, Knowledge Bowl, equestrian team, girls bowling, and forensics
Spring: theatre, baseball, boys' soccer, fastpitch, girls' golf, girls' tennis, forensics, and boys' and girls' track

Notable alumni

 Dave Dowling (born 1942), MLB player
 Dave Nisbet (1910–1976), NFL player
 Andy Olson (born 1982), Arena Football League head coach
 Brock Peterson (born 1983), MLB player
 Orin C. Smith (1942–2018), CEO and President Starbucks Corporation from 2000 to 2005
 Elmer Tesreau (1905–1955), college football player for Washington

References

External links
School website

High schools in Lewis County, Washington
Public high schools in Washington (state)